Tallebudgera Valley is an outer locality in the City of Gold Coast, Queensland, Australia. It borders New South Wales.

Ingleside is a neighbourhood within Tallebudgera Valley.

Geography 
Tallebudgera Valley  is situated in the Gold Coast hinterland along the Queensland/New South Wales border.  In the far south west of the suburb the elevation rises to 800 m above sea level.  This area is protected within Springbrook National Park.

Tallebudgera Valley has the following mountains:

 Bally Mountain 
 Boyds Butte 
 Little Bally Mountain 
 Mount Cougal 
 Mount Cougal (East Peak) 
 Mount Cougal (West Peak) 
 Mount Gannon 
 Tallebudgera Mountain (Durran)

History 
Westbury Provisional School opened in 21 Mar 1892, becoming Westbury State School on 1 January 1909. It was renamed Ingleside State School on 25 January 1926.

The median age of the Tallebudgera Valley population was 43 years, 6 years above the national median of 37.  74.3% of people living in Tallebudgera Valley were born in Australia. The other top responses for country of birth were England 5.8%, New Zealand 5.5%, South Africa 0.9%, Netherlands 0.8%, Germany 0.6%.  89% of people spoke only English at home; the next most common languages were 0.8% French, 0.6% Dutch, 0.4% German, 0.3% Norwegian, 0.3% Maltese.

Education 
Ingleside State School is a government primary (Prep-6) school for boys and girls at 893 Tallebudgera Creek Road. In 2017, the school had an enrolment of 109 students with  13 teachers (7 full-time equivalent) and 6 non-teaching staff (4 full-time equivalent).

Amenities 
The Gold Coast City Council operates a fortnightly mobile library service which visits Ingleside State School, Tallebudgera Creek Road.

References

Suburbs of the Gold Coast, Queensland
Valleys of Queensland
Localities in Queensland